James Eric Hodder (December 29, 1940 – March 2, 2021) was a Canadian politician, who represented the electoral district of Port au Port in the Newfoundland and Labrador House of Assembly from 1975 to 1993, and again from 2003 to 2007. He started as a member of the Liberal Party, but in 1985 he crossed the floor to join Brian Peckford's Progressive Conservative government.

A graduate of Memorial University of Newfoundland with bachelor's degrees in history and education, he was a high school teacher and principal in Stephenville before entering politics. His father Walter also served in the Newfoundland assembly.

He retired from the legislature for health reasons in January 2007, and was succeeded by Tony Cornect in a by-election. He died in St. John's on March 2, 2021.

References

Liberal Party of Newfoundland and Labrador MHAs
Progressive Conservative Party of Newfoundland and Labrador MHAs
1940 births
2021 deaths
People from Stephenville, Newfoundland and Labrador
21st-century Canadian politicians